Harford is a surname. Notable people with the surname include:

 Henry Harford (1758–1834), 5th Proprietor of Maryland
 James Harford (1899–1993), British diplomat
 John Scandrett Harford (1785–1866), British banker, benefactor and abolitionist
 Losi Harford (born 1973), New Zealand cricketer
 Mick Harford (born 1959), English footballer
 Noel Harford (1930–1981), New Zealand cricketer
 Ray Harford (1945–2003), English footballer
 Roy Harford (born 1936), New Zealand cricketer
 Tim Harford (born 1973), English economist and journalist